The 2008 European Pairs Speedway Championship was the fifth edition of the European Pairs Speedway Championship. The final was held in Natschbach-Loipersbach, Austria on 20 September. 

Czech Republic were the defending European champions but Poland won their third title.

Calendar

Rules 
Semi-Final 1: 3 pairs will qualify to the Final
Semi-Final 2: 3 pairs will qualify to the Final
The pair of FMNR (Austria team) will be allocated to the Final

Semifinal 1 
  Rivne
 July 19

Draw 1.  →  B

Semifinal 2 
  Miskolc
 September 13

Draw 1.  →  B

Final 
Final
2008-09-20
 Natschbach-Loipersbach
Referee:
Jury President:

References 
 pzm.pl - UEM Calendar 2008
 pzm.pl - Allocation

See also 
 2008 Individual Speedway European Championship

2008
European Pairs